Joseph Claude Roger LaForge (July 1, 1936 – May 4, 2015) was a Canadian ice hockey player. He played in the National Hockey League with the Montreal Canadiens, Detroit Red Wings, and Philadelphia Flyers between 1958 and 1968. The rest of his career, which lasted from 1957 to 1973, was mainly spent in the American Hockey League.

Playing career
Before playing in the NHL, LaForge played 2 games with the Montreal Royals and one season with the Shawinigan Falls Cataractes of the Quebec Hockey League (QHL) and one season with the Cincinnati Mohawks of the International Hockey League (IHL). In 1958, LaForge was named to the QHL Second All-Star Team.

He started his NHL career with the Montreal Canadiens during the 1957–58 season. He would play a total of 5 games with the Canadiens. On June 3, 1958, the Canadiens traded LaForge along with Gene Achtymichuk and Bud MacPherson to the Detroit Red Wings in exchange for money.

LeForge spent time between the Red Wings and their American Hockey League-affiliates, the Hershey Bears and Pittsburgh Hornets. After spending parts of 5 years with Detroit, he was sent down to the Hornets and was then traded to the Quebec Aces of AHL in exchange for Terry Gray on March 1, 1966.

When the Philadelphia Flyers bough the Aces on May 8, 1967, LaForge's NHL rights were transferred to the team. He played 65 regular season games with the Flyers. In August 1970, the Flyers traded LaForge to the Denver Spurs of the Western Hockey League (WHL) in exchange for money. After spending 3 seasons with the Spurs, LaForge retired from playing professional ice hockey.

Career statistics

Regular season and playoffs

References

External links
 

1936 births
2015 deaths
Canadian expatriate ice hockey players in the United States
Canadian ice hockey left wingers
Cincinnati Mohawks (IHL) players
Denver Spurs players
Detroit Red Wings players
French Quebecers
Hershey Bears players
Ice hockey people from Quebec
Montreal Canadiens players
Montreal Junior Canadiens players
Montreal Royals (QSHL) players
Philadelphia Flyers players
Pittsburgh Hornets players
Quebec Aces (AHL) players
Rochester Americans players
Shawinigan-Falls Cataracts (QSHL) players
Sportspeople from Sorel-Tracy